William Bedle (4 March 1680 – 3 June 1768) was an English cricketer who played for Dartford Cricket Club and Kent county cricket teams in the first quarter of the 18th century. With the possible exception of Charles Lennox, 1st Duke of Richmond, Bedle is the earliest known accomplished player, certainly the earliest who is renowned solely for his expertise as a player. He was born in Bromley but lived most of his life near Dartford, where he was a wealthy farmer and grazier.

Cricket career
Bedle is the first known cricketer "who achieved great prominence in the game". His obituary in Lloyd's Evening Post dated 10 June 1768 said that he was "formerly accounted the most expert cricket player in England". Rowland Bowen wrote that Bedle was "the first in a long line that must include Fuller Pilch, W. G. Grace, Jack Hobbs and Wally Hammond".

Bedle played in the first quarter of the 18th century. He was a member of Dartford Cricket Club, which was "the greatest Kent team of the first half of the eighteenth century" and which was sometimes considered representative of Kent as a county. Few details of cricket matches from the early 18th centuries have survived, and so what is known about Bedle's career has been pieced together by historical analysis; contemporary newspaper reports rarely mentioned a player by name with the emphasis often on betting rather than on matches.

Personal life
Bedle lived near Dartford for most of his life where he was a farmer and grazier. His name, also spelled Beddel, is recorded on a tablet in Dartford Parish Church listing the bellringers of 1749. He died at his home near Dartford on 3 June 1768, aged 88.

References

Bibliography
 
 
 
 

1680 births
1768 deaths
English cricketers
Kent cricketers
English cricketers of 1701 to 1786